Quercus pachyloma is an Asian species of tree in the beech family Fagaceae. It is native to southern China (Fujian, Guangdong, Guangxi, Guizhou, Hunan, Jiangxi, Taiwan, Yunnan). It is placed in subgenus Cerris, section Cyclobalanopsis.

Quercus pachyloma is a tree up to 17 meters tall. Twigs are covered with orange-brown hairs. Leaves can be as much as 14 cm long.

References

External links
line drawing, Flora of China Illustrations vol. 4, fig. 393, drawings 1-8 at center and right

pachyloma
Flora of China
Plants described in 1863